The Women's 50m Butterfly at the 2007 World Aquatics Championships took place on 30 March (prelims & semifinals) and the evening of 31 March (finals) at the Rod Laver Arena in Melbourne, Australia. 99 swimmers were entered in the event, of whom 93 swam.

Existing records at the start of the event were:
World Record (WR):  25.57, Anna-Karin Kammerling (Sweden), 30 July 2002 in Berlin, Germany.
Championship Record (CR): 25.84, Inge de Bruijn (Netherlands), Barcelona 2003 (26 July 2003)

Results

Finals

Semifinals

Preliminaries

See also
 Swimming at the 2005 World Aquatics Championships – Women's 50 metre butterfly
 Swimming at the 2009 World Aquatics Championships – Women's 50 metre butterfly

References

Women's 50m Butterfly Preliminary results from the 2007 World Championships. Published by OmegaTiming.com (official timer of the '07 Worlds); Retrieved 2009-07-11.
Women's 50m Butterfly Semifinals results from the 2007 World Championships. Published by OmegaTiming.com (official timer of the '07 Worlds); Retrieved 2009-07-11.
Women's 50m Butterfly Final results from the 2007 World Championships. Published by OmegaTiming.com (official timer of the '07 Worlds); Retrieved 2009-07-11.

Swimming at the 2007 World Aquatics Championships
Women's 50 metre butterfly
2007 in women's swimming